"Maybe" is a song with words and music originally credited to End Records owner George Goldner and "Casey". The co-writing credit was later transferred to Richard Barrett. Arlene Smith, lead singer of the Chantels, is believed to be an uncredited co-writer. The song was first recorded by the Chantels on October 16, 1957, in a doo-wop style with Barrett playing piano, and released in December 1957.  It climbed the charts in January 1958, reaching No. 15 in the Billboard Hot 100 and No. 2 in the Billboard R&B chart. It was subsequently described as "arguably, the first true glimmering of the girl group sound". Rolling Stone ranked it No. 199 on its list of The 500 Greatest Songs of All Time. It was also included in Robert Christgau's "Basic Record Library" of 1950s and 1960s recordings, published in Christgau's Record Guide: Rock Albums of the Seventies (1981).

Billboard named the song No. 60 on its list of 100 Greatest Girl Group Songs of All Time.

References

External links
 Chantels – History of Rock

1957 songs
1958 singles
1964 singles
1970 singles
The Chantels songs
The Shangri-Las songs
Songs written by Richie Barrett
Songs written by George Goldner
End Records singles
Red Bird Records singles
Song recordings with Wall of Sound arrangements